Anthony Washington (born January 16, 1966, in Glasgow, Montana) is an American former discus thrower, who competed in three consecutive Summer Olympics. At the 1999 World Championships in Seville, Washington won the gold medal in discus throw.

His personal bests are 71.14 m in discus and 59.58 m in hammer throw. He is a four-time national champion in the men's discus event.

He once appeared in a Snickers Olympics candy bar commercial.

International competitions

References

Notes

1966 births
Living people
People from Glasgow, Montana
Track and field athletes from Montana
American male discus throwers
Olympic track and field athletes of the United States
Athletes (track and field) at the 1992 Summer Olympics
Athletes (track and field) at the 1996 Summer Olympics
Athletes (track and field) at the 2000 Summer Olympics
Pan American Games medalists in athletics (track and field)
Athletes (track and field) at the 1991 Pan American Games
Athletes (track and field) at the 1999 Pan American Games
World Athletics Championships athletes for the United States
World Athletics Championships medalists
Pan American Games gold medalists for the United States
Universiade medalists in athletics (track and field)
Universiade silver medalists for the United States
World Athletics Championships winners
Medalists at the 1991 Summer Universiade
Medalists at the 1991 Pan American Games
Medalists at the 1999 Pan American Games